Lucanus may refer to:

People
Marcus Annaeus Lucanus, Roman poet
Friedrich von Lucanus (1869–1947), German ornithologist
Gnaeus Domitius Lucanus, Roman suffect consul
Jan Lucanus, American comic book writer, filmmaker and entrepreneur
Ocellus Lucanus, supposed Pythagorean philosopher
one of the knights of the Round Table
 Latin for a person from Lucca
 Latin for a member of the Italian tribe of the Lucanians
 Latin for a person from Lucania

Beetles
Lucanus (beetle), genus of beetles
Conotrachelus lucanus, a species of true weevil
Hister lucanus, a species of clown beetle
Styloxus lucanus, a species of Cerambycidae beetle